Ramona Hernandez, community leader, sociologist and historian, is Professor of Sociology at City College of New York and the director of the CUNY Dominican Studies Institute. She is the author of various scholarly works about Dominican migration, workers mobility, and the restructuring of the world economy.

Education
In 1979, Ramona Hernandez completed a BA in Latin American History, with a Minor in Puerto Rican Studies at Lehman College. She then received an M.A., Latin American and Caribbean Studies from New York University and a Ph.D. in Sociology from The Graduate Center, CUNY.

Professional career
Ramona Hernandez became the director of the DSI in 2001. In 2003, Mayor Michael R. Bloomberg appointed her to the NYC Board of Education. In 2004, she rejected one of the mayor's proposals, which took major attention in the press.

Hernandez is also a trustee of the Sociological Initiatives Foundation and of the International Institute of Advanced Studies in the Social Sciences.

Honors
Meritorious Order of Duarte, Sánchez y Mella.

Select bibliography
 "The Dominican Americans" (1998)  
 "The Mobility of Workers Under Advanced Capitalism: Dominican Migration to the United States" (2002) 
 "Desde la Orilla: hacia una nacionalidad sin desalojos" (2004)

References

Year of birth missing (living people)
Living people
American community activists
American sociologists
American women sociologists
American women historians
City College of New York faculty
City University of New York alumni
American people of Dominican Republic descent
Lehman College alumni
New York University alumni
21st-century American women